Nurlanbek Turgunbekovich Shakiev (born 13 May 1977) is a Kyrgyz politician. He is a member of the Supreme Council of Kyrgyzstan and a deputy from the Ata-Zhurt Kyrgyzstan faction.

References 

Kyrgyzstani legislators
1977 births
Living people